Lucama is a town in Wilson County, North Carolina, United States. The population was 1,108 at the 2010 census.

History
The Lucama Municipal Historic District was listed on the National Register of Historic Places in 1986.

Geography
Lucama is located at  (35.643684, -78.008333).

Demographics

As of the census of 2000, there were 847 people, 387 households, and 229 families residing in the town. The population density was 1,429.8 people per square mile (554.3/km2). There were 415 housing units at an average density of 700.5 per square mile (271.6/km2). The racial makeup of the town was 78.16% White, 16.17% African American, 0.47% Asian, 4.13% from other races, and 1.06% from two or more races. Hispanic or Latino of any race were 6.49% of the population.

There were 387 households, out of which 25.3% had children under the age of 18 living with them, 43.7% were married couples living together, 12.7% had a female householder with no husband present, and 40.6% were non-families. 34.4% of all households were made up of individuals, and 13.2% had someone living alone who was 65 years of age or older. The average household size was 2.18 and the average family size was 2.78.

In the town, the population was spread out, with 20.9% under the age of 18, 8.9% from 18 to 24, 27.7% from 25 to 44, 23.0% from 45 to 64, and 19.5% who were 65 years of age or older. The median age was 40 years. For every 100 females, there were 91.2 males. For every 100 females age 18 and over, there were 88.7 males.

The median income for a household in the town was $28,125, and the median income for a family was $37,750. Males had a median income of $26,786 versus $22,596 for females. The per capita income for the town was $17,634. About 11.5% of families and 18.8% of the population were below the poverty line, including 22.3% of those under age 18 and 22.4% of those age 65 or over.

References

External links
 Official website of Lucama, NC

Towns in North Carolina
Towns in Wilson County, North Carolina